The 2014 UCI Juniors Track World Championships was the 11th annual Junior World Championship for track cycling held at the Gwangmyeong Velodrome in Gwangmyeong, South Korea from 8 to 12 August 2014.

Medals were won across 19 disciplines.

Medal summary

Notes 
 Held on a 333m track. Team sprint records are only kept for 250m tracks.

Medals table

References

External links

2014 UCI Junior World Track Cycling Championships trackcyclingnews.com
Track Cycling - 2014 World Junior Championships (change the event to get more detailed results) the-sports.org

UCI Juniors Track World Championships
Uci Juniors Track World Championships, 2014
Track cycling
Sport in Seoul
International cycle races hosted by South Korea